Edwin Lewis Z'berg (March 20, 1926 – August 26, 1975) was a Democratic member of the California State Assembly representing the 9th district from 1958 to 1974, and 4th district from 1974 until his death in 1975.
He served in the United States Navy during the World War II era. As chair of the Committee on Natural Resources, he crafted legislation that established open space, funded state park acquisitions, created a workable system of state timber management, and established off-road vehicle policies. In the 1960s and early 70s he led California's actions to protect Lake Tahoe's environment, authoring a bistate regional authority bill that created the Tahoe Regional Planning Agency, TRPA. He was unstinting in efforts to strengthen TRPA's protections of the lake. Ed Z'berg Sugar Pine Point State Park on Tahoe's west shore is named for him, as are a neighborhood and park in southwestern Sacramento near Interstate 5.

References

External links

1926 births
1975 deaths
20th-century American politicians
Democratic Party members of the California State Assembly
United States Navy sailors
United States Navy personnel of World War II